Vladimir Voltchkov defeated Ivan Ljubičić in the final, 3–6, 6–2, 6–3 to win the boys' singles tennis title at the 1996 Wimbledon Championships.

Seeds

  Michal Tabara (first round)
  Peter Wessels (semifinals)
  Sébastien Grosjean (second round)
  Björn Rehnquist (second round)
  Mattias Hellström (first round)
  Vladimir Voltchkov (champion)
  Amir Hadad (third round)
  Martin Lee (quarterfinals)
  Rodolfo Rake (first round)
  Arnaud Di Pasquale (third round)
  Jocelyn Robichaud (third round)
  Marcos Daniel (second round)
  Mariano Puerta (second round)
  Daniele Bracciali (third round)
  Michel Kratochvil (first round)
  Paradorn Srichaphan (quarterfinals)

Draw

Finals

Top half

Section 1

Section 2

Bottom half

Section 3

Section 4

References

External links

Boys' Singles
Wimbledon Championship by year – Boys' singles